Toby Sedgwick (born 16 August 1958) is a British movement director, actor and theatre choreographer. He achieved critical acclaim for his expressive "horse choreography" for life-size puppets used in War Horse (2007), which played at West End's New London Theatre, Broadway's Vivian Beaumont Theater and Toronto's Princess of Wales Theatre. For the latter, Sedgwick won a 2008 Laurence Olivier Award for Best Theatre Choreographer and a 2012 Dora Mavor Moore Award for Outstanding Choreography in a Play or Musical. Due to its success, the play went on a 30-city tour in the United States and was also produced in Australia and in Germany, opening late in 2013, just before the centenary of the first world war.

Early life and training 
Toby Sedgwick was born in England in 1958 and attended Bryanston School in Dorset. He trained at the Arts Educational (drama course). He later studied for two years at L'École Internationale de Théâtre Jacques Lecoq in Paris, where he co-founded "The Moving Picture Mime Show"'. in London.

Career

Early work and subsequent career 
Sedgwick made a directorial debut with Pidgin Macbeth (1998) at the National Theatre in London. In 2006, he choreographed Hergé's Adventures of Tintin at the Playhouse Theatre and Dick Whittington And His Cat at the Barbican. He also directed a Manchester production of The Taming of the Shrew.

Sedgwick's first major credit was providing co-direction for The 39 Steps (Criterion Theatre, West End, 2006). Acting credits include Earfull at the Battersea Arts Centre in 2007. Other credits include The Tempest (2007), His Dark Materials (2009), and Looking For Yoghurt (2009). Sedgwick had previously acted as "The Professor" in the West End musical Animal Crackers, which opened at the Lyric Theatre on 16 March 1999 and closed 15 May 1999.

Sedgwick has served as movement director for British productions of The Nativity, Cinderella, King Lear, The Government Inspector, Marat/Sade, Rosencrantz and Guildenstern Are Dead.

Other work 
Sedgwick's theatrical work outside England is limited; besides the Broadway transfer of War Horse, Sedgwick's lone New York movement-directorial credit is The 39 Steps, produced by the Roundabout Theatre Company starting in 2008. Billed as Alfred Hitchcock's The 39 Steps, it opened on Broadway at the American Airlines Theatre, later transferring to the Cort Theatre (and later the Helen Hayes Theatre) for an extended run.

Sedgwick assisted Danny Boyle with the choreography for the London 2012 Olympic Games Opening Ceremony.

Film and television 
In addition to theatre work, Sedgwick's film credits include 28 Days Later, Laissez-passe, and Shrooms. In addition to serving as movement director in films, he has also appeared in small acting roles, such as "Thompson" in Safe Conduct (2002), "Infected Priest" in 28 Days Later (2002), "Black Brother" in Shrooms (2007), and "Enemy Pilot" in Nanny McPhee and the Big Bang (2010). Sedgwick's first television role was as "Mummy" on Monster Café, which aired from 1994 to 1995 on Children's BBC.

References

External links 
National Theatre information page and profile

Credits

Toby Sedgwick at the London Theatre Database

1958 births
Living people
People educated at Bryanston School
British theatre directors
English male film actors
English male television actors
English choreographers
Laurence Olivier Award winners
L'École Internationale de Théâtre Jacques Lecoq alumni